is a fictional character who appears in the Sword Art Online series of light novels and anime by Reki Kawahara. She is more commonly known by her avatar name, her player name in the Gun Gale Online and Alfheim Online video games that the series is set in. She makes her series debut in the fifth light novel volume, titled Phantom Bullet, and the second season of the Sword Art Online anime, voiced by Miyuki Sawashiro in Japanese and Michelle Ruff in the English dub.

When she was eleven years old, Shino was involved in a post office robbery, where she killed the armed robber to defend her mother. As a result, she began to develop a fear of guns, deciding to play Gun Gale Online in hopes it would mend her trauma. The character has achieved popularity in anime and manga fandom, often appearing in fan polls and official merchandise, and has received positive critical reception, with acclaim directed at her appearance and depth of character.

Creation and conception
In an interview with series creator Reki Kawahara, the author noted that the female characters in Sword Art Online were not based on anyone he knew personally, with him stating "I don't usually make a character, setting, or anything before I start writing. As I write the story, the girls become what they are now. So, somehow, I don't know exactly, but somehow, my subliminal idea or some hidden emotion creates the characters to be strong and capable."

In real life, Shino wears glasses containing an NXT polymer which could withstand a bullet; although they are not prescription, they provide her with some security as a result of her trauma. Series artist abec told Dengeki Bunko Magazine that the glasses had been created as he felt there were not enough characters in the series with glasses.

Appearances

In Sword Art Online

When she was two years old, her father died in a car accident. Eight years later, while at a post office, an armed robber attempted to shoot a pregnant woman, but lost control of the gun after Shino bit his hand. Afterwards, she shot him three times, killing him. Since, she developed a fear of guns, entering panic attacks whenever one is visible. As a result, she is bullied at school by her peers, with a finger gun being enough to trigger her phobia. To help ease her trauma, her friend Kyōji Shinkawa convinced her to play Gun Gale Online. Known as Sinon ingame, her main weapon is the «PGM Ultima Ratio Hecate II» sniper rifle, which she earned after defeating a monster in a dungeon.

Shortly before the Bullet of Bullets (BoB) tournament, Sinon encounters Kirito, deciding to help him after believing he is female due to his avatar. After Kirito's true gender was revealed, an angered Sinon attempts to leave him, but they meet again during the BoB. The two are confronted by Death Gun, who causes Sinon's PTSD to relapse when his weapon was revealed to be a Type 54 pistol, the same weapon she had used in the post office shooting. She is rescued by Kirito and the two escape, though she is afraid to attack Death Gun. With his help, Sinon overcomes her fear and the two defeat Death Gun. Afterwards, the two end the tournament as co-winners after Sinon kills them both with a «Gift Grenade». Upon exiting GGO, Shino is visited by Shinkawa, who congratulates her on winning the BoB. However, angry at Kirito, he attacks her with intentions of committing double suicide, and reveals himself to be one of Death Gun's creators. Shino manages to resist his attack and escape, but is stopped by Shinkawa before she could exit the house; Kirito arrives and fights Shinkawa, the latter eventually being knocked out by Shino throwing her stereo at him.

After the Death Gun incident, Sinon seems to have gotten over her fear and is moving on from the incident, no longer vulnerable to her classmates' threats of using a gun on her. In Agil's café, Shino meets Asuna, Rika, and Sachie Osawa, a woman who had survived the post office incident, who convinces her that she had saved her and her daughter's life. Sinon eventually decides to play Alfheim Online with Kirito and his friends.

In other media
Sinon appears in the Sword Art Online video games. In Sword Art Online: Infinity Moment and Hollow Fragment, she is trapped in Sword Art Online as a result of a glitch while testing a full-dive machine known as the Medicuboid. In the sequel Sword Art Online: Lost Song, she becomes a playable character.

Reception

Critical commentary

Richard Eisenbeis of Kotaku praised Sinon's role in Sword Art Online II, describing her as "easily the deepest character to come out of Sword Art Online". Likewise, Carly Smith of The Escapist found Sinon to be a "breath of fresh air" in a show like Sword Art Online, which could have "ended after its first arc, halfway through the first season." In reviewing the second episode of the Sword Art Online II anime, Salvador GRodiles of Japanator.com wrote that "Sinon isn't a pushover in battle" and is also "a force to be reckoned with", and found her character to be enjoyable. In concluding his review of Sword Art Online II, Sinon's character and story were praised again, writing "Overall, A-1 were able to wrap up Sword Art Online II'''s Phantom Bullet nicely. We got to see Shino slowly recover from her trauma and the show did a decent job in explaining the process behind Shinkawa and his older brother's evil scheme – even if their scheme had some far-fetched elements. To top it all off, they were able set things up for the next big storyline in the series."

GRodiles also praised the interactions between Sinon and Kirito after Kirito revealed to her his true gender, claiming "the series deserves some props for the way how they executed Kirito and Sinon's recent interaction [...] While most viewers might criticize SAO for having Sinon react negatively towards Kirito when he told her the truth, the guy kind of deserved it for not being honest with her when they first met. Thanks to this situation, we can see both characters develop in a way that won't turn into a mindless sequence where Kazuto pretends to be a woman; thus destroying any distractions that would prevent the show's plot from moving forward." In a review of the first Blu-ray disc of the Sword Art Online II anime, Theron Martin of Anime News Network praised Sinon as a "strong female co-lead", noting how unlike the other recurring female characters of the franchise, she is the only one not defined by her relationship with Kirito, but rather an incident from her past.

Martin continued his review in part two, where he lauded the writing of Sinon's backstory and sufferance of PTSD as "masterful", writing "The way she falls apart even in her Sinon persona when faced with a particular stressor is quite credible, as is the way she struggles to cope with her crushing fear; she is desperately afraid to die, but even more afraid of living with the fear [...] [It] almost seems like a deliberate message is being sent to the audience, and the way she finally finds her resolve and fights back when her life is in serious jeopardy is heartening." He also praised Michelle Ruff's voice acting in the English dub. Anime News Network's Rebecca Silverman also praised Sinon's portrayal, noting her to be "a much more interesting character" than both Kirito or Asuna, as "what makes Sinon a more successful character than any to previously appear in the main series is that she has more depth. Rather than being just a scared or traumatized character, she's someone who is actively working to change herself [...] it feels like this is a turning point for Kawahara's writing skill. Sinon isn't perfectly depicted, but she's got more going on than previous characters." Sam of The Otaku's Study similarly noted how Sinon already established herself as "one of the most developed Sword Art Online characters" despite appearing in only 7 episodes thus far, praising her backstory and contrast between her in-game and out-of-game personas.

Popularity

Sinon is regarded as one of the most popular characters in Sword Art Online. A Charapedia poll which asked fans to list their favorite "cool" women in anime, had Sinon placed 13th with 203 votes. She also placed 8th on another Charapedia poll of the "top 20 female anime/manga characters not to provoke." Sinon was awarded third in a Dengeki Bunko character poll for their light novels. A third Charapedia poll asking respondents to rank their favourite "Short-Haired Anime Girls" ranked Sinon 16th, with 136 points. In a poll by the app Otamart asking users to rank the anime characters they would want to give and receive chocolates from for Valentine's Day, Sinon was ranked 14th and 16th, respectively among male voters. Dorkly listed Kirito and Sinon beating the Death Gun tournament as one of the greatest moments in Sword Art Online. In a poll to determine the characters who would appear on the cover of abec's Sword Art Online art book, Sinon finished with the third-most votes.

Anime website GoBoiano listed "Sharp Shooter Sinon" as one of the positive aspects of Sword Art Online II, noting her intelligence and strength, as well as Kirito not knowing her outside of gaming allowing the two to bond in a way different to the other girls in the franchise. She also made a list of their "14 Anime Marksmen That You Can't Hide From", where she ranked 14th, as well as the "15 Anime Characters You Wish You Could Waifu", with author Aaron Magulick adding "Sinon is calm and cool, but she'll snipe you right in the heart. Once you get past her cold exterior, you'll find a loving person that'll protect you from afar. Which works when you're stuck in a gun-based mmo." A Newtype character poll had Sinon placed first in female characters, notably edging out fellow Sword Art Online character Asuna. In a fan contest where respondents chose between 41 options for the next Sword Art Online figurine, Sinon placed fourth (Gun Gale Online version) and ninth (Alfheim Online version).

Merchandise
The popularity of the character has resulted in several official Sword Art Online merchandise featuring her, for example as a 1/8th scale Sinon statue. Sword Art Online girls (including Sinon) feature in a merchandise lottery by Bandai, where they are depicted in french maid clothing with cooking utensils, with Anime News Network humorously noting that they have "brought in a pretty penny for the franchise's creators." There are also Kirito, Asuna, and Sinon Sword Art Online-branded perfumes for sale; "Sinon" is described as "a mature scene of marin citrus and herbs. It uses green apple, herbs and lime above muguet, rose, jasmine and cyclamen above musk and brandy." Replica Sinon glasses were created by Cospa and serve both as a cosplay prop and also as prescription glasses. She also appeared in promotional advertisements for the video game Sword Art Online: Lost Song. There are also 3D light-up LED models of Kirito, Asuna, Sinon, and Leafa. A Sinon figurine was featured as a prize in a Banpresto Sword Art Online lottery in November 2014, along with other merchandise. Additionally, Kirito and Sinon also appear in anime-themed Christmas cards by San Diego card creator and retailer Papercut Dragon. A fanmade Grand Theft Auto V mod allows users to play as the character. Three character songs based on Sinon have been released: "Solitary Bullet", "Blazing Bullet" and "Relief Bullet", all of which were sung by her Japanese voice actress Miyuki Sawashiro, though "Blazing Bullet" was a duet featuring Kirito's voice actor Yoshitsugu Matsuoka.

References
Specific

General
 
 

External links
 Characters at the Sword Art Online official Japanese website
 Characters  at the Sword Art Online'' official North American website

Literary characters introduced in 2010
Female characters in anime and manga
Fictional characters with post-traumatic stress disorder
Fictional Japanese people in anime and manga
Fictional marksmen and snipers
Female soldier and warrior characters in anime and manga
Teenage characters in anime and manga
Sword Art Online characters